For democratic elections is the Vitsebsk city club of voters. The first official public organization in Vitsebsk. Organization was founded on January 18, 1990. The first meeting was held in the Palace of Railwaymen, was attended by 69 people. Governing body is the Management Board.

Objectives 
The objectives of the organization is to promote the ideas of democracy, national values, supporting the democratic candidates.

Literature 
 Вячаслаў Ракіцкі. Сто адрасоў свабоды. 1980—2010. (Бібліятэка Свабоды. ХХІ стагодзьдзе). — Радыё Свабодная Эўропа / Радыё Свабода, 2011. — с. 232

External links 
 Ад чыноўніка ў аблвыканкаме да апазіцыянера. Як жыве і змагаецца віцебскі дэмакрат Барыс Хамайда  // TUT.by 

1990 establishments in Belarus
Political history of Belarus